Fulwood Academy (formerly Fulwood High School) is a coeducational secondary school located in Fulwood, Preston) in the English county of Lancashire.

Previously a community school administered by Lancashire County Council, Fulwood High School converted to academy status on 1 September 2009 and was renamed Fulwood Academy. The school is sponsored by Charles Dunstone through a charitable trust, the Dunstone Education Trust.

Fulwood Academy offers GCSEs and BTECs as programmes of study for pupils.

Fulwood Academy's leadership has been in question over a number of years now, with the school having 5 headteachers (including interim headteachers). The current headteacher is Andrew Galbraith.

References

External links
Fulwood Academy official website

Secondary schools in Lancashire
Schools in Preston
Academies in Lancashire